The eighteenth season of NCIS, an American police procedural drama television series, originally aired on CBS from November 17, 2020 through May 25, 2021. The season only contained 16 episodes, making it the shortest in the series, and includes the series' 400th episode. The season was produced by Belisarius Productions and CBS Studios.

NCIS revolves around a fictional team of special agents from the Naval Criminal Investigative Service, which conducts criminal investigations involving the U.S. Navy and Marine Corps. The series stars Mark Harmon, Sean Murray, Wilmer Valderrama, Emily Wickersham, Maria Bello, Brian Dietzen, Diona Reasonover, Rocky Carroll, and David McCallum. The season is Bello's last as a series regular, as she left after eight episodes. The season finale serves as Wickersham's final appearance as Eleanor Bishop, leaving the series after 8 years. Several late-season episodes feature Pam Dawber, Harmon's real-life spouse.

Cast and characters

Main
 Mark Harmon as Leroy Jethro Gibbs, NCIS Supervisory Special Agent (SSA) of the Major Case Response Team (MCRT) assigned to Washington's Navy Yard (episodes 1–10) / suspended (episodes 11–16)
 Sean Murray as Timothy McGee, NCIS Senior Special Agent, second in command of MCRT
 Wilmer Valderrama as Nick Torres, NCIS Special Agent
 Emily Wickersham as Eleanor "Ellie" Bishop, NCIS Special Agent
 Maria Bello as Dr. Jacqueline "Jack" Sloane, NCIS Senior Resident Agent and Operational Psychologist (episodes 1–8)
 Brian Dietzen as Dr. Jimmy Palmer, Chief Medical Examiner for NCIS
 Diona Reasonover as Kasie Hines, Forensic Specialist for NCIS
 Rocky Carroll as Leon Vance, NCIS Director
 David McCallum as Dr. Donald "Ducky" Mallard, NCIS Historian

Recurring
 Joe Spano as Tobias Fornell, Private Detective and former FBI agent
 Margo Harshman as Delilah Fielding-McGee, DoD Intelligence Analyst and McGee's wife
 Pam Dawber as Marcie Warren, investigative journalist
 Laura San Giacomo as Dr. Grace Confalone, psychotherapist
 Nick Boraine as Merriweather, NCIS target
 Adam Campbell as Young Ducky
 Sean Harmon as Young Gibbs
 Hugo Armstrong as Eugene Coyle, from the NCIS Inspector General's office
 Juliette Angelo as Emily Fornell, Tobias Fornell's daughter
 Elayn J. Taylor as Odette Malone, owner of Ziva's private office and former CIA Operative
 Victoria Platt as Veronica Tyler, NCIS Special Agent
 Jack Fisher as Phineas, Gibbs' former neighbor
 Karri Turner as Micki Kaydar, Phineas' aunt

Guest stars
 Thomas F. Wilson as Angus DeMint, author "Journey of Adventure."
 Steven Bauer as Miguel Torres, Nick Torres' father
 William Allen Young as Moses McClaine, U.S. Secretary of Defense
 Zane Holtz as Dale Sawyer, NCIS Special Agent
 Tijuana Ricks as Pamela Walsh, CIA Agent
 Chris Browning as Tom Dalton, NCIS REACT Special Agent
 Katrina Law as Jessica Knight, NCIS REACT Special Agent

Episodes

Production

Development
The season was ordered on May 6, 2020. On June 3, 2020, Steven D. Binder announced that the writers had begun working on the season. Scripts initially written for cancelled Season 17 episodes were integrated into this season's second and fourth episodes, "Everything Starts Somewhere" and "Sunburn." The exit of Maria Bello's Jacqueline Sloane, which would have occurred in the unproduced Season 17 finale, was integrated into the season's eighth episode, "True Believer," though similarities to the originally planned storyline remain undetermined. On August 12, 2020, it was announced that CBS Television Studios had signed a deal with the law enforcement advisory group 21CP Solutions, to consult on its crime and legal dramas, which includes NCIS. 21CP Solutions will help the series to more accurately portray law enforcement; this comes after the George Floyd Protests, which caused the television industry to rethink their portrayal of law enforcement. On September 21, 2020, it was announced that the season would start by exploring where Gibbs, played by series star Mark Harmon, disappeared to during the episode "Musical Chairs" from the previous season, before returning to the present day. On October 27, 2020, it was announced that season would comprise sixteen episodes.

Filming
The planned twenty-first episode of the seventeenth season, which was postponed due to production on the season being shut down due to the COVID-19 pandemic, was the first episode filmed of season eighteen. The planned twenty-second episode of season seventeen, which would have been the 400th episode of the series, was filmed and aired second, which kept it as the 400th episode. Production on the eighteenth season began on September 9, 2020, and the series continued to be filmed in Los Angeles. Filming for season 18 wrapped up on March 29, 2021.

Casting
On May 6, 2020, it was announced that Harmon had closed a new deal with CBS Television Studios. On July 24, 2020, it was announced that series regular Maria Bello is set to leave the show during the season, and appear in eight episodes to wrap up her character's storyline. On September 9, 2020, it was announced that Harmon's son Sean, would return in episode two as a younger version of his father's character. On October 21, 2020, it was announced that Adam Campbell would also return in episode two, as a younger version of Ducky. In March 2021, Katrina Law was cast in the role of Jessica Knight. Law appeared  in the final two episodes of the season with the potential to become a series regular if the series is renewed for a nineteenth season. On May 26, 2021, it was confirmed that series regular Emily Wickersham would leave the series after 8 years.

Release
The season is set to premiere during the 2020–21 television season as part of CBS's Tuesday lineup with FBI and FBI: Most Wanted. On August 26, 2020, it was announced that CBS hoped to begin airing the season in November 2020. On October 13, 2020, it was announced that the season would premiere on November 17, 2020. It was also announced that this will be the final season on the Tuesday timeslot, it will be moved on Mondays on its 19th season leading into its new spinoff series NCIS: Hawaiʻi.

Ratings

References

NCIS 18
2020 American television seasons
2021 American television seasons
Television productions postponed due to the COVID-19 pandemic
Television shows about the COVID-19 pandemic